Robin Ghosh (13 September 1939 – 13 February 2016) was a Pakistani-Bangladeshi playback singer and film music composer, best known for singing and composing music for Lollywood films from 1961 to 1986. Playback singer Ahmed Rushdi has a notable contribution to Ghosh's success. Ghosh gained fame in the mid-1960s when Rushdi sang his compositions in films like Chakori (1967), Jahan Tum Wahan Hum, Paisa, etc.

Early life
Robin Ghosh's father worked for the International Red Cross and was posted at Baghdad during the Second world war, where Ghosh was educated in a convent school. His father was a Bengali Hindu, who had never converted to Christianity and his mother was an Arab Catholic Christian named Asnat Zia Ghosh, a Baghdadi Catholic Christian. When Ghosh was young, his father S.M Ghosh left the family and married another woman leaving the family to Asnat, which she raised all by herself in Wari, Old Dhaka. His brother, Ashok Ghosh, was a film director in Bangladesh and directed the film Nacher Putol 1972, which has the famous song “”Rup Nogorer Rajkonna.

When the Second World War ended in 1945, the six-year-old Ghosh along with his family moved to Dhaka, in Bengal (in pre-partitioned India). He showed interest in music, collecting gramophone records and playing the harmonium, and finally graduated with music major in Dhaka.

Family life
In the late 1950s, Ghosh was offered a job at the Dhaka Radio Station by a friend. This friend's sister, Shabnam who occasionally played in various Bengali films, became friends with him. The two finally got married. Together they had a son, Ronnie (born 1966).

Film career
Since Robin Ghosh was a Christian, he had exposure to 'choir singing' at his church. When he was young, he had also worked with veteran film music composer Salil Chowdhury. Later he also worked, as an assistant, with a Pakistani film music composer from Bengal, Muslahuddin. In the early 1960s, film director Ehtesham visited Dhaka Radio Station, and offered Ghosh a contract as a composer for his films. His debut was for the Bengali film Raj Dhanir Bookay in 1960, and followed by numerous other Bengali and Urdu films, including Chanda (1962), Talash (1963), Paisa (1964), Chakori (1967)  and Bhaiya (1966). After the release of the film Tum Meray Ho, Ghosh moved to Karachi, Pakistan continuing to compose film music into the 1980s. He composed songs for the film Aaina (1977) one of the greatest films ever made in the Pakistani film industry. This film celebrated its Platinum Jubilee at the Pakistani cinemas.

discography

Awards and recognition
Robin Ghosh won a total of 6 Nigar Awards for the following films:
Nigar Award for best film composer for Talash (1963) 
Nigar Award for best film composer for Chakori (1967) 
Nigar Award for best film composer for Chahat (1974)
Nigar Award for best film composer for Aaina (1977)
Nigar Award for best film composer for Bandish (1980)
Nigar Award for best film composer for Doorian (1984)

Death and legacy
On 10 February 2016, Ghosh became ill and was admitted to a hospital in Dhaka, Bangladesh. He died on 13 February 2016 due to respiratory failure. He was 78 years old.

References

External links
 

1937 births
2016 deaths
Bangladeshi Christians
Bangladeshi people of Arab descent
Bengali musicians
Musicians from Baghdad
Bangladeshi film score composers
Pakistani film score composers
Male film score composers
20th-century composers
21st-century composers
Nigar Award winners
Pakistani composers
Pakistani Christians
Pakistani emigrants to Bangladesh
Pakistani people of Bengali descent
Pakistani people of Iraqi descent
20th-century male musicians
21st-century male musicians